Boston 6:58pm is the first of two 7"'s in Bane's set of "world series" releases. It was released in America on Triple-B Records as Boston 6:58pm, in Europe on Hurry Up! Records as Dublin 11:58pm, and in conjunction with the 2nd 7" as a CD in Australia on Resist Records as Perth 7:58am, in Japan on Alliance Trax as Tokyo 7:58am, and in South America on Hurry Up! Records as Curitiba 7:58pm.

Personnel 
Aaron Bedard - vocals
Aaron Dalbec - guitar
Zach Jordan - guitar
Brendan Maguire - bass
Bob Mahoney - drums

Other contributors 
additional vocals - Mayra Montijo
layout & design - Peter Chilton
cover photography - Dan Gonyea

External links
Triple-B Records
Hurry Up! Records
Resist Records
Alliance Trax

References and footnotes

Bane (band) albums
2009 EPs